Centory was a German Eurodance group consisting of Gary Carolla, Alexander Strasser, Sven Kirschner, and Turbo B.

Centory released one album, Alpha Centory, in 1994. It featured the singles "Point of No Return", "Take It to the Limit", "The Spirit" and "Eye in the Sky".

Centory also remixed two songs, "Mercy" and "Heart of Me" for a remix album by Cerrone. The band's last work was the single "Girl You Know It's True" released in 1996. This single was Centory's only single to not feature Turbo B; instead it featured a new singer, Trey D.

Discography

Albums

Singles

References 

German Eurodance groups
German dance music groups